Johns Creek is a city in the U.S. state of Georgia.

Johns Creek may also refer to:

Johns Creek (Chattahoochee River), a stream in Georgia
Johns Creek (Oostanaula River), a stream in Georgia
Johns Creek (Little Lost Creek), a stream in Missouri
Johns Creek (Saline Creek), a stream in Missouri
Johns Creek (Jackson County, North Carolina), a stream in North Carolina

See also
Saint Johns Creek (disambiguation)